The 167th Infantry Regiment (nicknamed "4th Alabama") is an infantry regiment of the United States Army National Guard. The unit traces its history back to the Seminole Wars.

The 167th Infantry Regiment's history lives on in the 1st Battalion, 167th Infantry, "4th Alabama", part of the Alabama National Guard.

Origins 
The 167th Infantry Regiment was formed in 1836. They fought in the Civil War at Seven Pines, Second Manassas, Antietam, Gettysburg and The Wilderness as the 4th Alabama (symbolized in the 13 blue stars on the coat of arms). The regiment fought for the Confederacy as part of the Alabama Brigade.

In 1916, they skirmished with Pancho Villa's bandits along the Mexican border during the Pancho Villa Expedition.

World War I 
The 167th Infantry Regiment fought under the 42nd Division in World War I and fought in five major campaigns, symbolized in the 5 fleurs-de-lis on their coat of arms. The red cross embattled commemorates the carrying of entrenched Croix Rouge Farm below Fere-en-Tardenois in the Battle of Soissons on 26–27 July 1918.

World War II 

The 167th Regiment was assigned to the 31st Division during World War II and fought in the Pacific in the Battle of the Philippines.

2005 and 2007 deployments to Iraq 
When the 1-167th Infantry Battalion deployed to Iraq in 2005, Company A of the 167th was selected for mobilization. The infantrymen's mission was focused on finding and fixing insurgents, but also providing security for the population as a whole; particularly, during the Iraqi democratic elections of 2005. Voters took part in the first free elections since the fall of Saddam Hussein and his ruling Baath party.

When the 1-167th Infantry Battalion was deployed to Iraq again in 2007, Company C of the 167th was mobilized for Iraq.  The unit's main mission provided critical security escorts from the Kuwaiti border crossing throughout Iraq to all Forward Operating Bases (FOBs). This even included missions to other country's FOBs, such as the South Korean FOB located near the Northern Turkish border. 

The largest of all 1144th Joint Logistics Task Force elements, the Alabama Company brought 196 members to OIF, of the 210 members that had been deployed to Iraq. At various times, all members were on missions to and from Iraq at the same time.

2012 deployment to Afghanistan
The 1-167th Infantry Battalion deployed to Afghanistan in 2012 to conduct security force missions in support of NATO Training Mission - Afghanistan (NTM-A) throughout the Afghanistan theater of operations to provide freedom of maneuver for NTM-A and regional support command assets.

The 4th Alabama Tab
The tab was created to honor the 1-167th's Civil War history as the 4th Alabama Regiment, lineage acknowledged by its officially recognized 4th Alabama special designation. 

The 1-167th Infantry has been under many different higher commands, including the 31st Infantry Division, the 35th Infantry Division, the 149th Armor Brigade, the 226th Maneuver Enhancement Brigade, the 31st Separate Armored Brigade, the 48th Brigade Combat Team, and the 142nd Battlefield Surveillance Brigade.  The 1-167th Infantry is the 3rd maneuver battalion assigned to the 53rd Infantry Brigade Combat Team.

Current Structure
Headquarters and Headquarters Company, 1st Battalion, 167th Infantry at Talladega, Alabama
Company A, 1st Battalion, 167th Infantry at Tuscaloosa, Alabama
Company B, 1st Battalion, 167th Infantry at Pelham, Alabama
Company C, 1st Battalion, 167th Infantry at Cullman, Alabama
Company D, 1st Battalion, 167th Infantry at Calera, Alabama
Forward Support Company (FSC) at Oxford, Alabama

Regimental Commanders
Col. Laroy S. Graham, May 16, 1945 -

See also
 The Alabama Brigade (American Civil War)
 31st Infantry Division

References

Thomas, Brenda. 2012. The Alabama National Guard. New Croix Rouge Farm memorial honors 167th Infantry Regiment. .
Whitman, Kalisha. 2012. NBC Channel 13 Alabama Alabama National Guard deploys historic infantry unit again.
Marshall, Mike. 2005. Mobile Register. http://www.al.com/armedforces/mobileregister/index.ssf?stories/december11_05.html

External links
Task Force Centurion (1-167 IN) Facebook. https://www.facebook.com/TaskForceCenturion
Pictures of 2005 deployment to Iraq, A Company, https://www.youtube.com/watch?v=c8ax2ZPzxBY
Afghanistan. 2012. http://blog.al.com/afghanistan/2012/11/alabama_guards_167th_infantry.html
Iraq 2005-2006. Journal. http://www.submarineboat.com/blown_up.htm
Pictures from 167th in World War II. https://www.flickr.com/photos/charlesduggar/sets/72157617441304263/

167
Infantry regiments of the United States Army in World War II
United States Army regiments of World War I
Military units and formations established in 1836
Infantry regiments of the United States Army National Guard
1836 establishments in the United States